David Romney (born June 12, 1993) is an American professional soccer player who plays as a defender for New England Revolution in Major League Soccer.

Career
Born and raised in Irvine, California, Romney began his professional career with LA Galaxy II, having previously played in the U.S. Soccer Development Academy with the Irvine Strikers as well as the University of San Francisco men's soccer team and amateur club San Francisco City FC. He made his USL debut against Sacramento Republic FC in March 2015. He became the first LA Galaxy II player to sign a MLS contract when he was signed by LA Galaxy on August 5, 2015.

Romney was re-signed by the LA Galaxy at the beginning of the 2019 season.

On November 12, 2019, Romney was traded to Nashville SC ahead of their inaugural season in MLS. LA Galaxy received $225,000 in General Allocation Money and will receive an additional $50,000 in General Allocation Money if Romney meets certain performance-based metrics.

On January 5, 2023, Romney was traded to New England Revolution in exchange for a total of $525,000 in General Allocation Money.

Personal life
Romney is a distant relative of 2012 Republican Party presidential candidate, former governor of Massachusetts and current United States Senator from Utah, Mitt Romney.

Career statistics

Club

References

External links
 San Francisco Dons bio

1993 births
Living people
American soccer players
San Francisco Dons men's soccer players
LA Galaxy II players
LA Galaxy players
Nashville SC players
New England Revolution players
Association football defenders
Soccer players from California
Sportspeople from Irvine, California
USL Championship players
Major League Soccer players
United States men's under-23 international soccer players